Tom Greenway (28 September 1956 – 15 July 2004) was a Canadian judoka. He competed in the men's heavyweight event at the 1976 Summer Olympics. In 1986, he won the bronze medal in the +95kg weight category at the judo demonstration sport event as part of the 1986 Commonwealth Games.

References

External links
 

1956 births
2004 deaths
Canadian male judoka
Olympic judoka of Canada
Judoka at the 1976 Summer Olympics
Sportspeople from Lethbridge
Commonwealth Games medallists in judo
Commonwealth Games silver medallists for Canada
Judoka at the 1990 Commonwealth Games
Medallists at the 1990 Commonwealth Games